Solfernus' Path is the sixth album by the Polish symphonic black metal band Darzamat, released on August 28, 2009. It was recorded at several studios in Poland. The drums and guitars were recorded at HH Poland Studio in Gliwice, while the vocals were recorded at Maq Studio. The keyboard parts were recorded at Spectre (Darzamat's keyboard player)'s home studio. The album was produced by Jonas Kjellgren (Scar Symmetry) and featured a guest appearance by Andy LaRocque (of King Diamond) who played the guitar solo for the song King of Burning Anthems. La Rocque recorded his part in his own Sonic Train Studios in Varberg. They met when La Rocque produced their previous album Transkarpatia.

On the events of the Polish band's camp, the band's vocalist Nera comments:

Track listing CD
 "False Sleepwalker"
 "Vote for Heresy"
 "I Devium"
 "Pain Collector"
 "Final Conjuration"
 "II Fumus"
 "Gloria Inferni"
 "III Venenum"
 "Solfernus' Path"
 "Lunar Silhouette"
 "King of Burning Anthems"
 "IV Spectaculum"
 "Chimera"
 "A Mesmeric Séance"

Track listing Vinyl
 "False Sleepwalker"
 "Vote for Heresy"
 "Pain Collector"
 "Final Conjuration"
 "Gloria Inferni"
 "Solfernus Path"
 "Lunar Silhouette"
 "King of Burning Anthems"
 "Chimera"
 "A Mesmeric Séance"

Personnel
 Agnieszka "Nera" Górecka - vocals
 Rafał "Flauros" Góral - vocals
 Krzysztof "Chris" Michalak - electric guitar, bass guitar
 Patryk "Spectre" Kumór - keyboard instruments
 Mariusz "Rogol" Prętkiewicz - percussions
 Jonas Kljellgren - mixing

Photo shoots
A photo shoot for the band, which was taken in Świerklaniec, in Silesia, was done. Another photo shoot, where a 1934 BMW also took part, was also done.

External links
 Official website

References

2009 albums
Darzamat albums
Massacre Records albums